Hans Nicolussi Caviglia (born 18 June 2000) is an Italian professional footballer who plays as a midfielder for  club Salernitana, on loan from Juventus.

Club career
Having come through the youth ranks of Juventus, Nicolussi made his Serie C debut for Juventus U23 on 27 September 2018 in a game against Cuneo as an 88th-minute substitute for Idrissa Touré. On 8 March 2019, he made his Juventus senior debut in Serie A, coming on as a late substitute for Moise Kean in a 4–1 home victory over Udinese.

On 2 September 2019, he joined Serie B club Perugia on loan.

On 5 October 2020, he went to Serie A side Parma on loan. On 28 October, he made his Parma debut in Coppa Italia, starting in a 3–1 home victory over Pescara. However, on 15 December, during a training session, Nicolussi tore his ACL and needed to end his season early. Prior to this injury, Nicolussi had only been fielded twice: the other match he played was a 2–1 win Coppa Italia against Cosenza on 25 November.

On 18 August 2021, he had a meniscus tear. On 30 October, Nicolussi returned being called up for a match after the two injuries in a Juventus U23 match against Südtirol set to be played the following day. Against the same opponents, on 3 November, he returned playing after his injuries in a 2–1 Coppa Italia Serie C defeat, coming on as substitute in the 58th minute and scoring a goal four minutes later; he had not been playing since 25 November 2020. Nicolussi suffered a new knee injury on 20 November, during a match against Fiorenzuola. He was kept far from the pitch until 4 May 2022, when he first entered the field in a match against Pro Vercelli. On 10 May, Nicolussi was first called up since his injuries by the first team for the 2022 Coppa Italia Final.

On 12 July 2022, he was sent on loan to Serie B side Südtirol. On 22 October, he scored their winner against his former team Parma with a shoot under the top corner at the 29th minute.

On 5 January 2023, Nicolussi was recalled by Juventus, subsequently joining fellow Serie A side Salernitana on loan until the end of the season, with option and counter-option to buy.

International career
Nicolussi was first called up to represent his country in December 2016 for the Italy U17. He was included in the squad for 2017 UEFA European Under-17 Championship and made one appearance, scoring against Spain as Italy did not advance from the group stage.

He was later called up to the U18 and U19 squads' friendlies. With the Italy U19 squad he took part in the 2019 UEFA European Under-19 Championship.

On 13 October 2020, he made his debut with the Italy U21, playing as a substitute in a qualifying match won 2–0 against Republic of Ireland in Pisa.

In December 2022, he was involved in a training camp led by the Italian senior national team's manager, Roberto Mancini, and aimed to the most promising national talents.

Career statistics

Club

International

References

External links
 

2000 births
People from Aosta
Footballers from Aosta Valley
Living people
Italian footballers
Italy under-21 international footballers
Italy youth international footballers
Association football midfielders
Juventus F.C. players
Juventus Next Gen players
A.C. Perugia Calcio players
Parma Calcio 1913 players
F.C. Südtirol players
U.S. Salernitana 1919 players
Serie A players
Serie B players
Serie C players
Mediterranean Games silver medalists for Italy
Mediterranean Games medalists in football
Competitors at the 2018 Mediterranean Games